Taxifolin (5,7,3',4'-flavan-on-ol), also known as dihydroquercetin, belongs to the subclass flavanonols in the flavonoids, which in turn is a class of polyphenols.

Stereocenters 
Taxifolin has two stereocenters on the C-ring, as opposed to quercetin which has none. For example, (+)-taxifolin has (2R,3R)-configuration, making it 1 out of 4 stereoisomers that comprise 2 pairs of enantiomers.

Natural occurrences 
Taxifolin is found in non-glutinous rice boiled with adzuki bean (adzuki-meshi).

It can be found in conifers like the Siberian larch, Larix sibirica, in Russia, in Pinus roxburghii, in Cedrus deodara and in the Chinese yew, Taxus chinensis var. mairei.

It is also found in the silymarin extract from the milk thistle seeds.

Taxifolin is present in vinegars aged in cherry wood.

Taxifolin, and flavonoids in general, can be found in many beverages and products. Specifically, taxifolin is found in plant-based foods like fruit, vegetables, wine, tea, and cocoa.

Pharmacology 
Taxifolin is not mutagenic and less toxic than the related compound quercetin. It acts as a potential chemopreventive agent by regulating genes via an ARE-dependent mechanism. Taxifolin has shown to inhibit the ovarian cancer cell growth in a dose-dependent manner. However, in this same study, taxifolin was the least effective flavonoid in the inhibition of VEGF expression. There is also a strong correlation (with a correlation coefficient of 0.93) between the antiproliferative effects of taxifolin derivatives on murine skin fibroblasts and human breast cancer cells.

Taxifolin has shown to have anti-proliferative effects on many types of cancer cells by inhibiting cancer cell lipogenesis. By inhibiting the fatty acid synthase in cancer cells, taxifolin is able to prevent the growth and spread of cancer cells.

Taxifolin also stops the effects of overexpression of P-glycoprotein, which prevents the development of chemoresistance. Taxifolin does this via inhibition of rhodamine 123 and doxorubicin. 

The capacity of taxifolin to stimulate fibril formation and promote stabilization of fibrillar forms of collagen can be used in medicine. Also taxifolin inhibited the cellular melanogenesis as effectively as arbutin, one of the most widely used hypopigmenting agents in cosmetics. However, arbutin acts as quercetin extremely mutagenic, carcinogenic and toxic.

Taxifolin also enhances the efficacy of conventional antibiotics like levofloxacin and ceftazidime in vitro, which have potential for combinatory therapy of patients infected with methicillin-resistant Staphylococcus aureus (MRSA).

Taxifolin can act as an anti-flammant because of its ability to inhibit the synthesis of cyclooxygenase by blocking prostaglandin synthesis. Cyclooxygenases converts to prostaglandin precursors. 

Like other flavonoids, taxifolin is able to function as an antifungal agent by blocking multiple pathways that promote the growth and proliferation of fungi. 

Taxifolin has also been found to reduce inhibitor of intestinal mobility especially when antagonized by verapamil.

Taxifolin has also been shown to be anti-hyperlipidemic by maintaining the normal lipid profile of the liver and keeping lipid excretion at normal levels. Taxifolin prevents hyperlipidemia by reducing the esterification of cellular cholesterol, phospholipid, and triacylglycerol synthesis.

Taxifolin, as well as many other flavonoids, has been found to act as a non-selective antagonist of the opioid receptors, albeit with somewhat weak affinity.
Taxifolin shows promising pharmacological activities in the management of inflammation, tumors, microbial infections, oxidative stress, cardiovascular, and liver disorders 

Taxifolin has been found to act as an agonist of the adiponectin receptor 2 (AdipoR2).

Metabolism 
The enzyme taxifolin 8-monooxygenase uses taxifolin, NADH, NADPH, H+, and O2 to produce 2,3-dihydrogossypetin, NAD+, NADP+, and H2O.

The enzyme leucocyanidin oxygenase uses leucocyanidin, alpha-ketoglutarate, and O2 to produce cis-dihydroquercetin, taxifolin, succinate, CO2, and H2O.

Glycosides 
Astilbin is the 3-O-rhamnoside of taxifolin. Taxifolin deoxyhexose can be found in açai fruits.

Taxifolin 3-O-glucoside isomers have been separated from Chamaecyparis obtusa.

(-)-2,3-trans-Dihydroquercetin-3'-O-β-D-glucopyranoside, a taxifolin glucoside has been extracted from the inner bark of Pinus densiflora and can act as an oviposition stimulant in the cerambycid beetle Monochamus alternatus.

(2S,3S)-(-)-Taxifolin-3-O-β-D-glucopyranoside has been isolated from the root-sprouts of Agrimonia pilosa.

(2R,3R)-Taxifolin-3'-O-β-D-pyranoglucoside has been isolated from the rhizome of Smilax glabra.

Minor amount of taxifolin 4′-O-β-glucopyranoiside can be found in red onions.

(2R,3R)-Taxifolin 3-O-arabinoside and (2S,3S)-taxifolin 3-O-arabinoside have been isolated from the leaves of Trachelospermum jasminoides (star jasmine).

Derived natural compounds 
 Dihydroquercetin-3-O-rhamnoside (Astilbin)
 (+)-Leucocyanidin can be synthesized from taxifolin by sodium borohydride reduction.

References

Adiponectin receptor agonists
Flavanonols
Catechols
Resorcinols
Kappa-opioid receptor antagonists
Mu-opioid receptor antagonists
3-Hydroxypropenals